The Brahmic scripts, also known as Indic scripts, are a family of abugida writing systems. They are used throughout the Indian subcontinent, Southeast Asia and parts of East Asia. They are descended from the Brahmi script of ancient India and are used by various languages in several language families in South, East and Southeast Asia: Indo-Aryan, Dravidian, Tibeto-Burman, Mongolic, Austroasiatic, Austronesian, and Tai. They were also the source of the dictionary order (gojūon) of Japanese kana.

History 
Brahmic scripts descended from the Brahmi script. Brahmi is clearly attested from the 3rd century BCE during the reign of Ashoka, who used the script for imperial edicts, but there are some claims of earlier epigraphy found on pottery in southern India and Sri Lanka. The most reliable of these were short Brahmi inscriptions dated to the 4th century BCE and published by Coningham et al. (1996). 

Northern Brahmi gave rise to the Gupta script during the Gupta period, which in turn diversified into a number of cursives during the medieval period. Notable examples of such medieval scripts, developed by the 7th or 8th century, include Nagari, Siddham and Sharada.

The Siddhaṃ script was especially important in Buddhism, as many sutras were written in it. The art of Siddham calligraphy survives today in Japan. The tabular presentation and dictionary order of the modern kana system of Japanese writing is believed to be descended from the Indic scripts, most likely through the spread of Buddhism.

Southern Brahmi evolved into the Kadamba, Pallava and Vatteluttu scripts, which in turn diversified into other scripts of South India and Southeast Asia. Brahmic scripts spread in a peaceful manner, Indianization, or the spread of Indian learning. The scripts spread naturally to Southeast Asia, at ports on trading routes. At these trading posts, ancient inscriptions have been found in Sanskrit, using scripts that originated in India. At first, inscriptions were made in Indian languages, but later the scripts were used to write the local Southeast Asian languages. Hereafter, local varieties of the scripts were developed. By the 8th century, the scripts had diverged and separated into regional scripts.

Characteristics

Some characteristics, which are present in most but not all the scripts, are:
 Each consonant has an inherent vowel which is usually a short ‘ə’ (in Bengali, Assamese and Odia, the phoneme is /ɔ/ due to sound shifts). Other vowels are written by adding to the character. A mark, known in Sanskrit as a virama/halanta, can be used to indicate the absence of an inherent vowel.
 Each vowel has two forms, an independent form when not attached to a consonant, and a dependent form, when attached to a consonant. Depending on the script, the dependent forms can be either placed to the left of, to the right of, above, below, or on both the left and the right sides of the base consonant.
 Consonants (up to 4 in Devanagari) can be combined in ligatures. Special marks are added to denote the combination of 'r' with another consonant.
 Nasalization and aspiration of a consonant's dependent vowel is also noted by separate signs.
 The alphabetical order is: vowels, velar consonants, palatal consonants, retroflex consonants, dental consonants, bilabial consonants, approximants, sibilants, and other consonants. Each consonant grouping had four stops (with all four possible values of voicing and aspiration), and a nasal consonant.

Comparison 
Below are comparison charts of several of the major Indic scripts, organised on the principle that glyphs in the same column all derive from the same Brahmi glyph.  Accordingly:
 The charts are not comprehensive. Glyphs may be unrepresented if they do not derive from any Brahmi character, but are later inventions.
 The pronunciations of glyphs in the same column may not be identical.  The pronunciation row is only representative; the International Phonetic Alphabet (IPA) pronunciation is given for Sanskrit where possible, or another language if necessary.
The transliteration is indicated in ISO 15919.

Consonants 

Notes

Vowels 
Vowels are presented in their independent form on the left of each column, and in their corresponding dependent form (vowel sign) combined with the consonant k on the right. A glyph for ka is an independent consonant letter itself without any vowel sign, where the vowel a is inherent.

Notes

Numerals 

Notes

List of Brahmic scripts

Historical
The Brahmi script was already divided into regional variants at the time of the earliest surviving epigraphy around the 3rd century BC. Cursives of the Brahmi script began to diversify further from around the 5th century AD and continued to give rise to new scripts throughout the Middle Ages. The main division in antiquity was between northern and southern Brahmi. In the northern group, the Gupta script was very influential, and in the southern group the Vatteluttu and Kadamba/Pallava scripts with the spread of Buddhism sent Brahmic scripts throughout Southeast Asia.

Northern Brahmic

 Gupta, 4th century
 Sharada
 Landa
 Gurmukhi
 Khojki
 Khudabadi
 Mahajani
 Multani
 Takri
 Dogri
 Sirmauri
 Siddhaṃ
 Nagari 
 Devanagari
 Modi
 Gujarati
 Nandinagari
 Kaithi
 Sylheti Nagari
 Kamarupi
 Assamese
 Gaudi
 Bengali–Assamese (Eastern Nagari)
 Assamese
 Bengali
 Tirhuta (Mithilakshar)
 Odia
 Nepalese
 Bhujimol
 Ranjana
 Soyombo
 Pracalit
 Tibetan
 Meetei Mayek
 Lepcha
 Limbu
 Khema
 'Phags-pa
 Zanabazar square
 Marchen
 Marchung
 Pungs-chen
 Pungs-chung
 Drusha
 Dives Akuru
 Kalinga
 Bhaiksuki
 Tocharian (Slanting Brahmi)

Southern Brahmic

Tamil-Brahmi, 2nd century BC
 Pallava
 Tamil
 Grantha
 Malayalam
 Tigalari
 Saurashtra
 Khmer
 Khom Thai
 Proto-Tai script?
 Sukhothai
 Thai
 Fakkham
 Thai Noi
 Lao
 Tai Viet
 Dai Don
 Lai Tay
 Lai Pao
 Cham
 Kawi
 Balinese
 Batak
 Buda
 Javanese
 Old Sundanese
 Sundanese
 Lampung
 Lontara
 Makasar
 Rencong
 Rejang
 Baybayin
 Buhid
 Hanunó'o
 Tagbanwa
 Kulitan
 Basahan
 Mon–Burmese
 Modern Mon
 Burmese
 Chakma
 S'gaw Karen
 Shan
 Tanchangya
 Lik-Tai scripts
 Ahom
 Khamti
 Tai Le
 Tai Tham
 New Tai Lue
 Pyu
 Vatteluttu
 Kolezhuthu
 Malayanma
 Sinhala
 Bhattiprolu
 Kadamba
 Telugu-Kannada
 Kannada
 Goykanadi
 Telugu

Unicode 

As of Unicode version 15.0, the following Brahmic scripts have been encoded:

See also 
 Devanagari transliteration
 International Alphabet of Sanskrit Transliteration
 National Library at Kolkata romanisation
 Bharati Braille, the unified braille assignments of Indian languages
 Indus script – symbols produced by the Indus Valley Civilisation
 Indian Script Code for Information Interchange (ISCII) – the coding scheme specifically designed to represent Indic scripts

References

External links 

 Online Tool which supports Conversion between various Brahmic Scripts
 Windows Indic Script Support
 An Introduction to Indic Scripts
 South Asian Writing Systems
 Enhanced Indic Transliterator Transliterate from romanised script to Indian Languages.
 Indian Transliterator A means to transliterate from romanised to Unicode Indian scripts.
 Imperial Brahmi Font and Text-Editor
 Brahmi Script
 Xlit: Tool for Transliteration between English and Indian Languages
 Padma: Transformer for Indic Scripts  – a Firefox add-on